The Classical Language of Architecture is a 1965 compilation of six BBC radio lectures given in 1963 by Sir John Summerson. It is a 60-some page discussion of the origins of classical architecture and its movement through Antiquity, Renaissance, Mannerist, Baroque, Neoclassical, and Georgian periods. A discussion of the rules and elements in classical terms of the Orders, architectural harmony of design, are included. In 2017 it remains in print in several countries, in illustrated editions of about 144 pages, with 119 illustrations, plus small diagrams. For the original radio broadcasts the BBC published a booklet with 60 photographs of the buildings discussed (or plans etc), which were expanded in the book editions. 

Summerson, John. The Classical Language of Architecture. in UK now Thames and Hudson World of Art series (1980), etc. In US Boston: MIT Press, 1965, and other editions.

References

Summerson, John, The Classical Language of Architecture, 1980 edition, Thames and Hudson World of Art series, 

Architecture books
1965 non-fiction books
Books of lectures
Illustrated books
Thames & Hudson books